Dendroctonus jeffreyi, known generally as the Jeffrey pine beetle or mountain pine beetle, is a species of crenulate bark beetle in the family Curculionidae. It is found in North America. The Jeffrey pine beetle is monophagous on the Jeffrey pine tree, a dominant yellow pine and most concentrated in areas ranging from Southwestern Oregon to Baja California to western Nevada. In its native range, it causes a significant amount of damage as large numbers of tree mortality have been documented. It is known to cause significant changes to the composition and structure of the Jeffrey pine tree.

References

Further reading

 
 

Scolytinae
Articles created by Qbugbot
Beetles described in 1909